Tucker Dupree is an American swimmer.  He won three medals at the 2012 Paralympic Games and one at the 2016 Paralympic Games. He has also set multiple world and American records in swimming.  He competes in the Paralympic classes S12/SB12/SM12.

Competition Results

2007
Dupree won the 100m butterfly, 100m backstroke and 200m individual medley, and took second in the 50m, 100m and 400m freestyle at the Long Course Can-Am Swimming Championships.

2008
In 2008, Dupree qualified for the U.S. Paralympic Swimming Team by placing first at the team trials in the 100m butterfly, 100m backstroke, 200m individual medley, 50m, 100m and 400m freestyle. At the Paralympic Games in Beijing he took 4 place in the 400m freestyle, 5th in the 100m butterfly and 100m backstroke, 6th place in the 50m freestyle and 100m backstroke, and 7th  in the 100m freestyle.  At the Long Course Can-Am Swimming Championships he placed second in the 100m butterfly and 200m individual medley and third  in the 50m, 100m and 400m freestyle.

2009
Dupree won the 100 butterfly at the 2009 World Championships. He also won silver medals in the 50m freestyle, 100m backstroke, and bronze medals in the 100m and 400m freestyle.  At the Long Course Can-Am Swimming Championships he took first  in the 50m and 100m butterfly, 100m backstroke, 50m and 100m Freestyle).  At the Short Course Canadian American Championships he won the 50m and 100m butterfly, 100m backstroke, 50m, and 100m freestyle.

2010
At his second World Championships, he took silver in the 100m freestyle, and bronze in the 100 backstroke, 50m freestyle, 400m freestyle, 100 fly.  At the Long Course CAN-AM Swimming Championships Dupree won the 50m and 100m freestyle, 200m individual medley, 100m backstroke, 100m butterfly and 400m freestyle.  At the Short Course Can-Am Swimming Championships he won first place in the 50m and 100m freestyle, 200m individual medley, 100m backstroke, 100m butterfly and 400m freestyle.

2011
Dupree made his first Pan Pacific team, and placed first at the championship in the 400m freestyle, second in the 100m butterfly, 500m freestyle and 100m backstroke, and third in the 100m freestyle.

2012
At the U.S. Paralympics Swimming Team  Trials he won the 50m and 100m freestyle, 100m backstroke and 100m butterfly.  In 2012 Dupree held 2 World records, and was ranked first in the world in the 50m and 200m butterfly, 2nd in the 50m Backstroke, 50m and 100m freestyle, and 3rd in the 50m breaststroke, 100m backstroke and 400m freestyle. At the Long Course Can-Am Swimming Championships he won the 50m butterfly, 50m freestyle, 50m and 100m backstroke.

2013
Dupree won a silver in the 100m backstroke, bronze in the 50m freestyle at the 2013 IPC World Championships.  He took first  in the 100 freestyle, 50 freestyle, 100 backstroke, and 100 fly at the Spring Can-Am swimming championship.

2014
In 2014, Dupree won the 100 freestyle, 50 freestyle, and 100 backstroke at the Can-Am National swimming Championship.

2015
Dupree won a bronze medal in the 100m backstroke at the IPC Swimming World Championships.  He took first in the 50m free and set an American Record at the Can-Am Swimming Championship.

2016
Dupree is expected to compete at the 2016 Paralympic Games in Rio.

Personal
At the age of 17, Dupree was diagnosed with Leber’s Hereditary Optic Neuropathy. He lost most of his central vision in both eyes. Dupree lives in Chicago and has a tattoo of the Olympic rings on his shoulder.

Awards

2007 WSY Andy Craver Determination Award Tim Stevens Scholarship Award Winner
2008 The Greater Raleigh Sports Council Courage of Character Award 
2011 Roger McCarville Male Athlete of the Year Award

References

Living people
1999 births
Paralympic swimmers of the United States
Swimmers at the 2012 Summer Paralympics
Paralympic gold medalists for the United States
Medalists at the 2012 Summer Paralympics
Paralympic medalists in swimming
American male freestyle swimmers
American male backstroke swimmers
American male breaststroke swimmers
American male butterfly swimmers
American male medley swimmers
S12-classified Paralympic swimmers
Sportspeople from Raleigh, North Carolina
21st-century American people